Sarah Ann Ogilvie (born 10 April 1959) is a Canadian former rower. She competed in the women's coxless pair event at the 1988 Summer Olympics.

References

External links
 

1959 births
Living people
Canadian female rowers
Olympic rowers of Canada
Rowers at the 1988 Summer Olympics
Rowers from Seattle
Commonwealth Games medallists in rowing
Commonwealth Games bronze medallists for Canada
Rowers at the 1986 Commonwealth Games
20th-century Canadian women
Medallists at the 1986 Commonwealth Games